Cabo Velas is a district of the Santa Cruz canton, in the Guanacaste province of Costa Rica.

History 
Cabo Velas was created on 30 November 1988 by Acuerdo Ejecutivo 430.

Geography 
Cabo Velas has an area of  km² and an elevation of  metres.

Villages
Administrative center of the district is the village of Matapalo.

Other villages in the district are Brasilito, Conchal, Flamingo, Garita Vieja, Jesús María, Lajas, Lomas, Playa Real, Puerto Viejo, Salinas, Salinitas, Tacasolapa, Playa Grande and Zapotillal.

Demographics 

For the 2011 census, Cabo Velas had a population of  inhabitants.

Transportation

Road transportation 
The district is covered by the following road routes:
 National Route 155
 National Route 180
 National Route 911
 National Route 933

References 

Districts of Guanacaste Province
Populated places in Guanacaste Province